Pevensie is the surname of some of the primary characters in some of C.S. Lewis' The Chronicles of Narnia books:

Edmund Pevensie
Lucy Pevensie
Peter Pevensie
Susan Pevensie

See also
Pevensey, village